Alpen is a municipality in the district of Wesel, North Rhine-Westphalia, Germany.

Geography
Alpen is situated in the Lower Rhine region, located between the Ruhr area and the border with the Netherlands. Adjacent cities are Rheinberg, Xanten.

Division of the town
The municipality consists of 4 districts: 
Alpen
Menzelen
Veen
Bönninghardt

History
Alpen was mentioned documentarily for the first time in 1074.

Politics
The local Municipal Council is represented by the Christian Democratic Union, Social Democratic Party of Germany, Alliance '90/The Greens and the Free Democratic Party.

Transportation
Alpen is reachable by the Bundesautobahn 57 and the federal highways B57 and B58. There is also a train, the RB31 from Duisburg Hbf (direction Xanten) every hour which stops at Alpen. From there it is a 10-minute walk into the centre of Alpen.

Security
The municipality of Alpen maintains a Volunteer Fire Department consisting three firehouses with about 105 active firefighter and 14 vehicles. In addition to the area of Alpen, the Bundesautobahn 57 is also part of the area of operation. Crime protection is provided by the state Police of North Rhine-Westphalia with stations in Rheinberg, Xanten and Kamp-Lintfort.

References

External links
 

Wesel (district)